The Old Texas Trail is a 1944 American Western film directed by Lewis D. Collins and written by William Lively. The film stars Rod Cameron, Eddie Dew, Fuzzy Knight, Ray Whitley, Virginia Christine, Joseph J. Greene, Marjorie Clements, George Eldredge and Edmund Cobb. The film was released on December 15, 1944, by Universal Pictures.

Plot

A western stageline is having trouble, and Jim Wiley (Rod Cameron) is sent in to find the problems. Wiley is shot, robbed of his ID and paperwork, and left for dead by those trying to disrupt the stageline. The thugs send in an imposter to impersonate Wiley and slow any progress. Wiley survives and gets a job on the stageline construction crew in the hopes of finding out who the leader is who's causing all the problems.

Cast        
Rod Cameron as Jim Wiley aka Rawhide Carney
Eddie Dew as Dave Stone
Fuzzy Knight as Hinkly Pinkerton 'Pinky' Pinkly
Ray Whitley as Amarillo
Virginia Christine as Queenie Leone
Joseph J. Greene as Jefferson Talbot
Marjorie Clements as Mary Lane
George Eldredge as Sparks Diamond
Edmund Cobb as Joe Gardner aka Jim Wiley
Jack Rube Clifford as Sheriff Thomas

References

External links
 

1944 films
1940s English-language films
American black-and-white films
American Western (genre) films
1944 Western (genre) films
Universal Pictures films
Films directed by Lewis D. Collins
1940s American films